Andreas Jeschke (born 6 September 1966) is a German former professional footballer who played as a forward.

References

External links
 

1966 births
Living people
German footballers
Association football forwards
VfB Lübeck players
VfL Bochum players
FC Eintracht Norderstedt 03 players
FC St. Pauli players
2. Bundesliga players
Place of birth missing (living people)